Aha! may refer to:

Aha! (airline brand), a defunct American regional airline brand
Aha! (company), an American software company
Aha! (film), a 2007 Bangladeshi film
Aha! (tabloid), a newspaper published in the Czech Republic
Aha! (TV program), an information and education TV program in the Philippines
"Aha!", a song by Imogen Heap

See also
AHA (disambiguation)